The 2019–20 Western Football League season (known as the 2019–20 Toolstation Western Football League for sponsorship reasons) was the 118th in the history of the Western Football League, a football competition in England. Teams were divided into two divisions; the Premier and the First. The season was abandoned on 26 March 2020, due to the coronavirus pandemic.

The constitution was announced on 19 May 2019.

This season, the Premier Division champions were to be promoted to Step 4. The runners-up in this division and ten other Step 5 divisions in other leagues were to be ranked according to PPG (points per game), and the top four in that ranking would also have been promoted. The remaining seven runners-up were to compete in "winner takes all" play-offs with seven clubs finishing bottom in Step 4 leagues, the winners being placed at Step 4 and the losers at Step 5 for 2020–21. Instead, alterations at Steps 4 and 5 were delayed until 2021–22.

The bottom clubs in all 14 Step 5 divisions were to be ranked according to PPG, and the 12 lowest-ranked clubs were to be relegated to Step 6.

In Division One, the top four clubs were to be promoted to Step 5, with the bottom two liable to relegation to Step 7.

League suspension and season abandonment
On 13 March 2020, on advice from the Football Association, the league announced that all Western League matches would be suspended due to the coronavirus pandemic, initially for a period of two weeks. On 16 March, the FA decided to postpone all matches across all FA Competitions until 3 April.

On 26 March 2020, the league season was formally abandoned, with all results being expunged, and no promotion or relegation taking place to, from, or between the two divisions. On 30 March 2020, sixty-six non-league clubs sent an open letter to the Football Association requesting that they reconsider their decision.

Premier Division
The Premier Division consisted of 21 clubs, increased from 20 last season, after Willand Rovers were promoted to Southern League Division One South, Hengrove Athletic were relegated to the Western League First Division, and Shortwood United were relegated and transferred to Hellenic League Division One West. Four new clubs joined:

Exmouth Town, promoted from the South West Peninsula League Premier Division.
Keynsham Town, champions of the First Division.
Street, resigned from the Southern League Division One South.
Tavistock, promoted from the South West Peninsula League Premier Division.

Initially, Chipping Sodbury Town were transferred to the Hellenic League Premier Division, but were reinstated after an appeal. The division therefore ran with 21 clubs.

League table at the time of abandonment

Stadia and locations

First Division
The First Division also remained at 20 clubs, after Keynsham Town were promoted to the Premier Division, Chard Town were demoted for failing ground grading requirements, and Chippenham Park folded. Three new clubs joined:

Almondsbury, transferred from Hellenic League Division One West.
Hengrove Athletic, relegated from the Premier Division.
Lebeq United, promoted from the Gloucestershire County Football League.

League table at the time of abandonment

Stadia and locations

Les Phillips Cup 
Preliminary Round ties were played from 17 September until 25 September 2019. 18 clubs from the First Division and Premier Division, entered at this stage of the competition.

First Round ties were played from 29 October until 4 November 2019. All remaining clubs from the First Division and Premier Division, entered at this stage of the competition.

Second Round ties were played from 26 November 2019 until 22 January 2020.

Quarter Final ties were played from 18 February 2019. Only three of the four scheduled ties took place due to the coronavirus pandemic.

References
 League tables

External links
 Western League Official Site

2019–20
9
Association football events curtailed and voided due to the COVID-19 pandemic